Daniel Louis "Danny" Valletto was an American professional darts player who played in the British Darts Organisation in the 1980s & 1990s. He left the Professional Darts Corporation in 1994.

Darts career
Valletto reached the final of the 1982 North American Open, losing to fellow countryman Nicky Virachkul.  Valletto played in the 1984 Winmau World Masters, losing in the first round to popular Scot Jocky Wilson.  He then qualified for the 1986 BDO World Darts Championship, but was beaten in the first round 3-0 by Welshman Ceri Morgan. Valletto won the Virginia Beach Classic Men's Singles Champion on the PDC in 1994.

World Championship Results

BDO
 1986: Last 32: (lost to Ceri Morgan 0–3) (sets)

References

External links
Profile and stats on Darts Database

American darts players
British Darts Organisation players
1935 births
2007 deaths